A total solar eclipse will occur on Wednesday, March 30, 2033. A solar eclipse occurs when the Moon passes between Earth and the Sun, thereby totally or partly obscuring the image of the Sun for a viewer on Earth. A total solar eclipse occurs when the Moon's apparent diameter is larger than the Sun's, blocking all direct sunlight, turning day into darkness. Totality occurs in a narrow path across Earth's surface, with the partial solar eclipse visible over a surrounding region thousands of kilometres wide.

Totality will be visible in Nome, Alaska, Utqiaġvik, Alaska and the Chukchi Peninsula in the mid-morning hours. This is the last of 55 umbral eclipses of Solar Saros 120. The 1st was in 1059. The total duration is 974 years.

Images 
Animated path

Related eclipses

Solar eclipses of 2033–2036

Saros 120

Metonic cycle

References

External links 
 http://eclipse.gsfc.nasa.gov/SEplot/SEplot2001/SE2033Mar30T.GIF

2033 in science
2033 3 30
2033 3 30